Austroaeschna muelleri is a species of large dragonfly in the family Telephlebiidae, 
known as the Carnarvon darner. 
It has been found only in Carnarvon National Park in Central Queensland, Australia, where it inhabits small rocky streams.

The male Austroaeschna muelleri is black with blue markings, while the female is brown with yellow markings.

Gallery

See also
List of dragonflies of Australia

References

Telephlebiidae
Odonata of Australia
Endemic fauna of Australia
Taxa named by Günther Theischinger
Insects described in 1982